The D.977 is a  long state road in Iğdır Province in Turkey. The route runs from the closed border checkpoint with Armenia, south to the intersection with the D.080. The route originally continued into Armenia, via the Մ3, until 1993 when Turkey and Armenia closed their borders. After the border closing, the road continues to serve small settlements in the vicinity.

References

977
Transport in Iğdır Province